Terence James Healy (born 1 September 1981) is an Australian politician. He has been a Labor member of the Western Australian Legislative Assembly since the 2017 state election, representing Southern River.

Healy worked as a teacher at Southern River College, and also served on Gosnells City Council.

References

1981 births
Living people
Australian Labor Party members of the Parliament of Western Australia
Members of the Western Australian Legislative Assembly
Australian schoolteachers
21st-century Australian politicians